Fairy Bones is an American alternative rock band from Phoenix, Arizona fronted by Chelsey Louise (lead vocals, rhythm guitar). In 2015, they received the title "Best Local Band" by Phoenix New Times. The band's first studio album, 0% Fun, was released on February 23, 2018. They received press coverage in Alternative Press, NPR, The Arizona Republic, Impose, and Paste. Notably, they opened for Highly Suspect, Doll Skin, Mother Mother, Kongos, Alien Ant Farm, Marcy Playground, Fuel and Kyle Gass Band.

Biography

2013-2015: Formation 
Fairy Bones was founded in 2013. They then recorded The Fairy Bones EP with producer Bob Hoag (The Ataris, Gin Blossoms) in Mesa, Arizona in June and self-released it in October.

In 2015, they recorded and released their first album Dramabot, again with Hoag.

2016-2020: 0% Fun debut and Highly Suspect tour 
In 2016, after a short hiatus to record and an instrumentation change, they were added as tour support for Highly Suspect on a string of west coast dates. They released two singles, "8 Ball" and "Pink Plastic Cups".

In 2017, they released their third single titled "No One Can Suffer Like I Can".

On February 23, 2018, they independently released their first studio album, 0% Fun.

In June 2019, Alternative Press premiered the bands last single to date, "bullshit, ur a nice guy", alongside a vertical music video.

2020-present 
In July 2020, the band announced they had disbanded.

The band announced their return via Phoenix New Times in October 2021 with an alternate line-up.

Band Members 
Current members

 Chelsey Louise – guitars, lead vocals (2012-2020, 2020–present)
 Ben Foos – bass (2012–2020, 2020–present)

Past members

 Robert Ciuca – guitars (2012–2020)
Matthew Foos – drums (2012–2020)

Discography

Albums
 0% Fun (2018)
 Dramabot (2015)

EPs
 The Fairy Bones EP (2013)

Singles
 "bullshit, ur a nice guy" (2019)
 "No One Can Suffer Like I Can" (2017)
 "Pink Plastic Cups" (2016)
 "8 Ball" (2016)

References

Alternative rock groups from Arizona
Musical groups from Phoenix, Arizona
Musical groups established in 2012
Musical groups disestablished in 2020
Musical groups reestablished in 2021
2012 establishments in Arizona
2020 disestablishments in Arizona
2021 establishments in Arizona